A list of films produced or released by the American distributor Lippert Pictures. Founded by Robert Lippert in 1945, the company's initial releases were often known as Screen Guild Productions. Later it enjoyed success by co-producing and releasing films by the British studio Exclusive Films. From 1955 Lippert dissolved his original company and began producing films to be released by 20th Century Fox, often under the Regal Films label.

1940s

1950s

References

Bibliography
 Davis, Blair. The Battle for the Bs: 1950s Hollywood and the Rebirth of Low-Budget Cinema. Rutgers University Press, 2012 
 McGee, Mark Thomas. Talk's Cheap, Action's Expensive - the Films of Robert L. Lippert. BearManor Media, 2014.

Lippert Pictures films
Lippert Pictures
Lippert Pictures